Mutinus elegans, commonly known as the elegant stinkhorn, the dog stinkhorn, the headless stinkhorn, or the devil's dipstick, is a species of fungus in the Phallaceae (stinkhorn) family. A saprobic species, it is typically found growing on the ground singly or in small groups on woody debris or leaf litter, during summer and autumn in Japan, Europe, and eastern North America. The fruit body begins its development in an "egg" form, resembling somewhat a puffball partially submerged in the ground. As the fungus matures, a slender orange to pink colored stalk emerges that tapers evenly to a pointed tip. The stalk is covered with a foul-smelling slimy green spore mass on the upper third of its length. Flies and other insects feed upon the slime which contains the spores, assisting in their dispersal. Due to their repellent odor, mature specimens are not generally considered edible, although there are reports of the immature "eggs" being consumed. In the laboratory, Mutinus elegans has been shown to inhibit the growth of several microorganisms that can be pathogenic to humans.

Taxonomy 
Mutinus elegans was first described by British missionary John Banister in 1679 who chronicled the natural history of Virginia; this early report is thought to be the first account of a fungus in North America. It was first characterized scientifically by French scientist Jean Pierre François Camille Montagne in 1856, who called it Corynites elegans.
The genus name Mutinus refers to the Roman phallic deity Mutunus Tutunus, one of the di indigetes placated by Roman brides. The species is commonly known variously as the "elegant stinkhorn", the "headless stinkhorn", the "dog stinkhorn", or the "devil's dipstick". The specific epithet elegans is derived from the Latin word meaning "graceful" or "elegant".

Description 

The stalk is hollow and strongly wrinkled overall; its shape is cylindrical below, but it gradually tapers to a narrow apex with a small opening at the tip. The upper half of the stalk is bright red to reddish orange, and the color gradually loses intensity transforming into pinkish white below. The stalk may be straight, or slightly curved. A gelatinous greenish-brown gleba covers the upper third of the stalk in newly emerged specimens. The remains of the "egg" forms a volva around the base of the stalk. The odor of the gleba is foul; one author describes it as "sickly sweet or metallic". The spores are a greenish-brown color. Fruit bodies are attached to the substrate by whitish rhizomorphs that resemble plant roots. American mycologist Smith noted that the eggs are often slow to open, sometimes taking up to two weeks before the stalk expands.

The spores are 4–7 by 2–3 µm, oblong-elliptical, smooth, and embedded in the gleba. A 1982 study revealed that spores of species in the family Phallaceae, including Mutinus elegans, have a hilar scar (0.2–0.3 µm diameter) that is observable with scanning electron microscopy. The hilar scar is a circular indentation at one end of the spore, and it most likely results during the separation of the attachment of the spore to the sterigma of the basidium.

Edibility 

The immature egg-forms of Mutinus elegans are edible, but "not recommended". One field guides notes that the eggs of the stinkhorn fungi "taste like the seasonings that are added to them." The fetid odor of mature specimens would probably be repellent to most, although they are not considered poisonous.

Similar species 

The "dog stinkhorn" (Mutinus caninus) is smaller, has a distinct oval or spindle-shaped tip on a slender stem and lacks the bright coloring of M. elegans; it has less of the stalk covered by gleba. The portion of the stalk below the spore mass is pitted in M. caninus, compared to "pebbly" in M. elegans. M. caninus is also less common than M. elegans. Mutinus bambusinus is similar in size and shape, except it does not have a distinct color demarcation between the upper and lower parts of the stalk; instead, the entire stem shows red pigments. The stalk of M. ravenelii is less tapered than M. elegans, and it has a clearly differentiated swollen head.

Habitat and distribution 
Mutinus elegans is saprobic—deriving nutrients by breaking down dead or dying organic matter. It is commonly found in gardens and farm areas enriched with manure, near well-decayed stumps and logs, and in wood chips. A Japanese publication mentioned its occurrence in Takatsuki and Osaka-fu, where it fruited in November and December on the ground along paths or in open spaces, under or near bamboo (Phyllostachys bambusoides) and hardwoods such as the Sawtooth Oak, the Japanese Zelkova, and the Camphor tree.

This common species has been collected in eastern North America, in the area extending from Quebec to Florida and west to the Great Lakes, Iowa, Colorado, and Texas.
In Europe, it has been reported from Netherlands and in Asia, it has been collected in Japan.

Antibiotic activity 
A study of 32 basidiomycete mushrooms showed that Mutinus elegans was the only species to show antibiotic (both antibacterial and antifungal) activity against all six microorganisms tested, namely, the human pathogenic bacteris Bacillus cereus, Bacillus subtilis, Staphylococcus aureus, Escherichia coli, Salmonella typhimurium and the yeast Candida albicans.

References

External links 
 
 Time lapse video of growing fruit body Cornell University, Department of Plant Pathology Photo Lab
 Image of spores Missouri Mycological Society
 Caromyxa elegans at mycobank.org

Phallales
Fungi described in 1856
Fungi of Asia
Fungi of Europe
Fungi of North America